This is a list of several past and present personalities on the ESPNews network. (NOTE: All of the current ESPNews anchors listed below are now SportsCenter anchors as of June 2013.)

Current
 Max Bretos: 2010–present (anchor, ESPNews)
 Linda Cohn: 1996–present (anchor, ESPNews)
 Kevin Connors: 2008–present (anchor, ESPNews)
 David Lloyd: 1997–present (anchor, ESPNews)

Former
 David Amber: 2003-2005 (anchor, ESPNews), now with the NHL Network
 Andre Aldridge: 1997-2000 (anchor, ESPNews), now with NBA TV
 John Anderson: 1999-2000 (anchor, ESPNews), now a SportsCenter anchor for ESPN
 Steve Berthiaume: 1999–2005, 2007–2012 (anchor, ESPNews), now an Arizona Diamondbacks play-by-play commentator with Bally Sports Arizona
 Michelle Bonner: 2005–2012 (anchor, ESPNews)
 Cindy Brunson: 1999-2012 (anchor, ESPNews), now with Bally Sports Arizona
 Steve Bunin: 2003–2012 (anchor, ESPNews), was in same position at Comcast SportsNet Houston (now Root Sports Southwest) until October 2014, now with Yahoo! Sports
 Ryan Burr: 2006–2011 (anchor, ESPNews), now with the Golf Channel
 Cara Capuano: 2000–2004 (anchor, ESPNews), now in same position at ESPNU
 Jonathan Coachman: 2008–2017 (anchor ESPNews), now WWE Pre show host
 Lindsay Czarniak 2011–2017 (anchor, ESPNews), was later a SportsCenter anchor for ESPN let go on August 31, 2017
 Neil Everett: 2001–2005 (anchor, ESPNews), now a Los Angeles-based SportsCenter anchor for ESPN
 Dave Feldman: 1996–2000 (afternoon anchor, ESPNews), now a SportsNet Central anchor for NBC Sports Bay Area
 Mike Golic: 2004-2005 (co-host, Mike & Mike)
 Mike Greenberg: 1996-2005 (co-host, Mike & Mike and anchor, ESPNews), now a SportsCenter anchor for ESPN in addition to his current duties on the aforementioned radio show
 Mike Hall: 2004–2005 (anchor, ESPNews), formerly with ESPNU from 2005-03-04 to 2007-04-27, now with BTN
 Mike Hill: 2005–2013 (anchor, ESPNews), now with Fox Sports 1
 Bob Halloran: 1999-2003 (anchor, ESPNews), now at WCVB-TV in Boston
 David Holmes: 2005–2006 (anchor, ESPNews), now a sports reporter and substitute sports anchor at WTVG (ABC) in Toledo, OH
 Jason Jackson: 1996-2002 (anchor, ESPNews), now a broadcaster for the Miami Heat
 Dana Jacobson: 2002-2005 (anchor, ESPNews), now co-host of TBD in the AM on CBS Sports Radio; also co-anchor on CBS This Morning Saturday; now with CBS News and Sports
 Brian Kenny: 2003–2005 (anchor, ESPNews, The Hot List), now with MLB Network
 Michael Kim: 1996–2013 (anchor, ESPNews), now with 120 Sports
 Mark Malone: 1996–2004 (anchor, ESPNews), now sports director for WBBM-TV (CBS) in Chicago, IL
 Jade McCarthy: 2012-2013 (anchor, ESPNews), was later a SportsCenter anchor, let go by ESPN on April 26, 2017
 Dari Nowkhah: 2004-2011 (anchor, ESPNews), now in same position at ESPNU
 Bill Pidto: 1996–2008 (anchor, ESPNEWS), now with MSG Network
 Dave Revsine: 1996–2007 (anchor, ESPNews), now lead anchor at BTN
 Scott Reiss: 2001–2008 (anchor, ESPNews), now with NBC Sports Bay Area
 Danyelle Sargent: 2003–2006 (anchor, ESPNews), now in same position at NFL Network
 Will Selva: 2007–present (anchor, ESPNews), now at NFL Network
 Bill Seward: 1996–2000 (anchor, ESPNews), now a sports anchor at NBC Sports, CBS Radio and PBP announcer of Rugby World Cup on NBC
 Anish Shroff: 2008-2012 (anchor, ESPNews), now an anchor and a play-by-play commentator at ESPNU
 Jaymee Sire: 2013–2017 (anchor, ESPNews), was later a SportsCenter anchor, let go by ESPN on April 26, 2017
 Mike Tirico: 1996–? (anchor, ESPNews), now a host and play-by-play commentator for NBC Sports; was an original anchor on ESPNews when it was launched on 1996-11-01
 Stan Verrett: 2002-2009 (anchor, ESPNews), now a Los Angeles-based SportsCenter anchor for ESPN
 Sara Walsh: 2010–2017 (anchor, ESPNews), was later a SportsCenter anchor, let go by ESPN on May 4, 2017
 Pam Ward: 1996–2004 (anchor, ESPNews), now a play-by-play commentator for ESPN
 Whit Watson: 1997–2002 (anchor, ESPNews), now with the Golf Channel
 Bram Weinstein: 2008-2010 (anchor, ESPNews), was later a SportsCenter anchor, left ESPN in 2015 
 Matt Winer: 2001–2009 (anchor, ESPNews), now with Turner Sports and NBA TV
 Mike Yam: 2008–2012 (anchor, ESPNews)
 Adnan Virk: 2010–2019 (anchor, ESPNews)

References

ESPNews